Viliam Schrojf (2 August 1931 – 1 September 2007) was a Slovak footballer who played as a goalkeeper. He received 39 caps for Czechoslovakia.

Career
Schrojf was a participant at the three consecutive World Cups 1954 FIFA World Cup, 1958 FIFA World Cup and at the 1962 FIFA World Cup, where Czechoslovakia surprised the world and went through to the final, losing to champions Brazil. The success of Czechoslovakia was largely attributed to Schrojf's superb performance. The final however proved to be a black day for Schrojf, with two Brazilian goals resulting from his mistakes. With his country leading 1–0, he expected a cross from Amarildo and left the goal, allowing the Brazilian to score from an acute angle. Halfway through the second half, with his side already 2–1 down, the sun got into his eyes and he failed to catch a simple ball properly, which landed directly at the feet of Vavá, who took the opportunity to become the first ever player to score in two different World Cup finals.

On club level, Schrojf played mostly for Slovan Bratislava and then for Lokomotiva Košice.

Death
On 2 September 2007, the Slovakian media reported that Schrojf had died the previous day, aged 76; the cause of death was not disclosed.

Honours
Slovan Bratislava
 Czechoslovak First League: 1955
 Czechoslovak Cup: 1961–62, 1962–63

Czechoslovakia
 FIFA World Cup runner-up: 1962

Individual
 FIFA World Cup All-Star Team: 1962
 FIFA World Cup Best Goalkeeper: 1962

References

External links

 
 

1931 births
2007 deaths
Czechoslovak footballers
1954 FIFA World Cup players
1958 FIFA World Cup players
1962 FIFA World Cup players
Association football goalkeepers
Footballers from Prague
Slovak footballers
1960 European Nations' Cup players
Czechoslovakia international footballers
ŠK Slovan Bratislava players
Czechoslovak expatriate footballers
Expatriate footballers in Austria
Czechoslovak expatriate sportspeople in Austria
Křídla vlasti Olomouc players
FC Lokomotíva Košice players
First Vienna FC players